Daulat Singh Kothari (6 July 1906 – 4 February 1993) was an Indian scientist and educationist.

Early life and education 
D. S. Kothari was born in the princely state of Udaipur in Rajputana on 6 July 1906., son of a Jain Headmaster. His father died in the plague epidemic of 1918 and was raised by his mother. He had his early education at Udaipur and Indore and received a master's degree in physics  from Allahabad University in 1928 under guidance of Meghnad Saha. For his PhD, Kothari worked at the Cavendish Laboratory, University of Cambridge under the supervision of Ernest Rutherford, to whom he was recommended by Meghnad Saha.

Role as an educationist 
After his return to India, he worked at the Delhi University from 1934 to 1961 in various capacities  as reader, professor and Head of the Department of Physics. He was scientific advisor to Ministry of Defence from 1948 to 1961 and was then appointed as chairman of the University Grants Commission in 1961 where he worked till 1973. He was the chairman of the Indian Education Commission of 1964–66, popularly known as Kothari Commission, which was the first ad hoc commission set up in India for the modernization and standardization of education in India.

Dr. D S Kothari (Padma Bushan & Padma Vibhushan), Scientific Advisor to Ministry of Defence, Govt. of India is an Outstanding Physicist, Educationalist and considered as the Architect of Defence Science in India. Founder of most of the DRDO labs in India i.e. Naval Dockyard Laboratory (later renamed Naval Chemical and Metallurgical Laboratory), Mumbai, Indian Naval Physical Laboratory, Kochi, Centre for Fire Research, Delhi, Solid State Physics Laboratory, Delhi, Defence Food Research Laboratory, Mysore, Defence Institute of Physiology and Allied Sciences, Chennai, Directorate of Psychological Research, New Delhi, Defence Electronics and Research Laboratory, Hyderabad, Scientific Evaluation Group, Delhi, Technical Ballistic Research Laboratory, Chandigarh. D S Kothari Played a crucial role in setting up of UGC and NCERT. Dr. D S Kothari and Dr. P Blackett worked together in Cavendish Laboratory, Cambridge University under the guidance of Lord Ernst Rutherford, the Father of Nuclear physics, later together they paved the defence education system in India.

Achievements and honours 
D. S. Kothari was president of the Indian Science Congress at its golden jubilee session in 1963. He was elected President of Indian National Science Academy in 1973. His research on statistical thermodynamics and his Theory of White Dwarf Stars gave him an international reputation.

The Padma Bhushan was conferred on him in 1962, and the Padma Vibhushan in 1973.
He was also listed as a "Proud Past Alumni" by the  "Allahabad University Alumni Association. In 2011, the Department of Posts issued a commemorative stamp in his honour. He was conferred Atmaram Award in 1990 by the Central Hindi Directorate, Ministry of Human Resource Development. One of the postgraduate men's hostels at Delhi University ( North Campus ) bears his name.

References 

1906 births
1993 deaths
20th-century Indian physicists
Recipients of the Padma Vibhushan in science & engineering
Recipients of the Padma Bhushan in civil service
University of Allahabad alumni
People from Udaipur
Scientists from Rajasthan
Fellows of the Indian National Science Academy
Foreign Members of the USSR Academy of Sciences
Foreign Members of the Russian Academy of Sciences